Alexandra Elena MacIver (born 18 June 1998) is an English professional footballer who plays as a goalkeeper for Women's Super League club Manchester City and the England women's national team.

Club career

Youth career
MacIver began her youth career at Everton. On 1 June 2014, she appeared as a substitute in the FA Girls' Youth Cup final against Liverpool held at Stadium MK. Everton lost 1–0. In 2015, she moved to the academy at Manchester City.

Clemson
In 2016, MacIver moved to the United States on a soccer scholarship to play for Clemson Tigers of the ACC. She made four appearances in her freshman year. From her sophomore year onward she was Clemson's starter, starting 17 games in each of the following three seasons. On 19 October 2019 she registered her first career assist, in a game against Syracuse.

Everton
On 2 January 2020, MacIver rejoined Everton after graduating from Clemson. She made her professional debut on 19 January 2020 in a 3–1 league win over Reading. On 1 November 2020, MacIver won the player of the match award in the 2020 Women's FA Cup Final, despite Everton losing 1–3 after extra time to her former club Manchester City.

Manchester City
On 2 July 2022, Manchester City announced the signing of MacIver on a three-year contract for an undisclosed fee.

International career

Youth
MacIver has represented England at under-17, under-19, under-20 and under-21 level. She started every game for England at the 2015 UEFA Women's Under-17 Championship; however, England were knocked out at the group stage. She also started every game at the 2017 UEFA Women's Under-19 Championship where England finished in fifth place. MacIver was part of the England squad that won bronze medal in the 2018 U20 World Cup in France, and was awarded the Golden Glove as the tournament's best goalkeeper.

Senior
In February 2019, MacIver named as part of the England senior team's traveling party during the 2019 SheBelieves Cup and trained with the team during the tournament but was not part of the playing squad. In August 2019, MacIver received her first senior England call up for friendlies against Belgium and Norway but did not make an appearance. She was left out the next two camps but returned as part of the 2020 SheBelieves Cup squad in February 2020 following a return to England with FA WSL club Everton. She made her senior international debut on 23 February 2021 as a 61st minute substitute in a 6–0 friendly win over Northern Ireland.

Team GB
On 27 May 2021, it was announced that MacIver had been selected as one of four reserve players for the Great Britain women's Olympic football team for the delayed 2020 Olympics, the third choice goalkeeper behind Ellie Roebuck and Karen Bardsley. Despite Bardsley being forced to withdraw a month prior to the tournament, MacIver remained a reserve player and Hege Riise called-up the previously unnamed Carly Telford as a replacement instead. On 1 July 2021, the IOC and FIFA confirmed squads would be expanded from 18 to 22 meaning MacIver would be available for selection to the matchday squad. She was included as an unused substitute for one match, a 1–1 group stage draw with Canada.

Personal life
On 29 May 2012, MacIver was a torch carrier during the 2012 Summer Olympics torch relay as it was taken through Chester.

Career statistics

Club
.

International

Honours
Manchester City
 FA WSL: 2015 runner-up

Everton
 Women's FA Cup: 2019–20 runner-up
England U20
FIFA U-20 Women's World Cup third place: 2018
England

 Arnold Clark Cup: 2023

Individual
 FIFA U-20 Women's World Cup Golden Glove: 2018

References

External links
 Profile at the Manchester City F.C. website
 Profile at the Football Association website
 

1998 births
Footballers from Cheshire
People from Winsford
Clemson Tigers women's soccer players
Living people
English women's footballers
England women's international footballers
Women's association football goalkeepers
English expatriate women's footballers
English expatriate sportspeople in the United States
Expatriate women's soccer players in the United States
Everton F.C. (women) players
Women's Super League players
Olympic footballers of Great Britain
Footballers at the 2020 Summer Olympics